Swimming at the 2012 Southeast Asian Swimming Championships was held 13–17 June in Singapore. It consisted of 38 events, swum in a long course (50m) pool.

Swimming Results

Men's events

Women's events

Swimming Medals

Diving
20 divers competed from Singapore and Malaysia and Indonesia in 8 events. Team Singapore took away 3 silver and 3 bronze medals from this competition.

References

2012 in swimming
Swimming competitions in Asia